Rutgers Law School is the law school of Rutgers University, with classrooms in Newark and Camden, New Jersey. It is the largest public law school and the 10th largest law school, overall, in the United States. Each class in the three-year J.D. program enrolls approximately 350 law students. Although Rutgers University dates from 1766, its law school was founded in Newark in 1908. Today, Rutgers offers the J.D. and a foreign-lawyer J.D., as well as joint-degree programs that combine a J.D. with a graduate degree from another Rutgers graduate program. Rutgers has law alumni who practice in every U.S. state and in foreign jurisdictions throughout the world. Current well-known alumni include U.S. Senators Elizabeth Warren (MA) and Robert Menendez (NJ) and three of seven sitting justices on the New Jersey Supreme Court. The late United States Supreme Court Justice Ruth Bader Ginsburg was a member of the Rutgers law faculty early in her career. Rutgers serves a unique role in New Jersey's legal landscape: the current Constitution of New Jersey was adopted in 1947 pursuant to a convention at Rutgers University (though not at the law school campus), and the Rutgers Law Library serves as a repository of New Jersey's key legal documents from the colonial era through current legislation and case law.

Above the Law ranked Rutgers 41st on its 2019 list of top law schools, while U.S. News & World Report, in its 2023 rankings of Best Graduate Schools, ranked Rutgers Law School 86th among 199 law schools fully accredited by the American Bar Association. Apart from its national standing, Rutgers serves as a unique institution in the legal landscape of New Jersey. According to Rutgers Law School's 2016 ABA-required disclosures, 93.7% of the Class of 2016 obtained full-time, long-term, JD-required or JD-advantage employment nine months after graduation, excluding solo practitioners.

History

Rutgers Law School is the oldest law school in New Jersey. Rutgers Law School has its roots in three law schools.  The first was founded October 5, 1908 as the New Jersey Law School, the second, the South Jersey Law School founded in 1926  by Collingswood, New Jersey mayor and businessmen Arthur E. Armitage, Sr. and the final was Mercer Beasley School of Law named for a former New Jersey Supreme Court Justice and founded in 1926 by several prominent Newark attorneys.

The New Jersey Law School was founded as a for-profit law school by Richard D. Currier, a New York lawyer and graduate of Yale and New York Law School. Currier was joined by Charles M. Mason, a New Jersey attorney, who served as dean until his death in 1928. The school originally had only three faculty members 30 students with classes on the 4th floor of the Prudential Insurance Home Office in Newark for their first classes. In December 1908, the school was moved to a large Victorian townhouse at 33 East Park Street also in Newark. From its founding, women were to be admitted on "equal basis to men."

After World War I, the New Jersey Law School saw increase in enrollment and by 1927, enrollment had peaked to more than 2,300 students, making it the second largest law school in the United States. In 1927 the school moved to the former Ballantine & Sons Ale Brewery at 40 Rector Street.

In 1934, Mercer Beasley School of Law and Newark Institute of Arts and Sciences merged to form the University of Newark and two years later, the New Jersey Law School joined establishing the University of Newark Law School. Combining the resources of the schools was designed created a stronger institution however the law school experienced a major decline in enrollment due to World War II and therefore was in a precarious financial condition.

In 1946, the University of Newark merged with Rutgers University and the law school was renamed the Rutgers University School of Law. In 1950, the South Jersey Law School in Camden, New Jersey,  merged with Rutgers University. The school was divided between the Newark Division and the South Jersey division based in Camden, with the dean and law school administration based in Newark. During the 1950s and 1960s the law school expanded in size creating the largest law library in New Jersey and its faculty tripled in size. In 1963, the future U.S. Supreme Court Justice Ruth Bader Ginsburg was hired as a law professor and served on the faculty until 1972. Ginsburg developed some of the concepts that led to the founding of the Women's Rights Litigation Clinic by Professor Nadine H. Taub, who was its director for many years, and the Women's Rights Law Reporter the first American legal journal dedicated women's rights.

In 1967, the South Jersey Division was split and created as a separate unit, creating two law schools: Rutgers School of Law – Camden and Rutgers School of Law – Newark. In 1968, following the Newark riots of 1967, the faculty created the Minority Students Program (MSP) one of the first law school affirmative action programs in the country, with the goal of increasing African American student enrollment. In 1978, the law faculty voted to admit students regardless of race and revamped the Minority Students Program to focus on socio-economically disadvantaged students in response to the Supreme Court's decision in Bakke. In Doherty V. Rutgers School Of Law-Newark  the 3rd Circuit Court of Appeals upheld the MSP in a lawsuit from a white student alleging discrimination. Throughout the 1970s the Newark campus was a center of activism and law students nicknamed it "The People's Electric Law School."  Its graduates from this period include United States Senators Elizabeth Warren and Robert Menendez.  After eliminating its evening program in 1955, in 1975, the law school restarted an evening program on Camden and Newark campus. From 1965 to 1978 the Newark division of the law school was located on Akerson Hall. In 1978, it moved to a skyscraper at 15 Washington Street which was renamed in honor of billionaire media baron Samuel I. Newhouse, Sr., a 1916 graduate of the law school. In January 2000, the school moved to the Center for Law and Justice, a newly constructed 225,000-square-foot, six-story building at 123 Washington Street in Newark. In 2015, Rutgers School of Law–Newark and Rutgers School of Law–Camden were unified into a single, jointly administered Rutgers Law School with two campuses.

Admissions
In 2018, Rutgers had a 48% acceptance rate, with 2,535 applications for admission and 1,237 offers. The for the 2018 admitted students, the LSAT 75% - 25% was 158-153 and the UGPA 75% - 25% was 3.61 - 3.08. Rutgers' admissions process offers applicants a choice between competing for admission based primarily on traditional measures such as LSAT scores and college GPAs, or, alternatively, on the basis of an applicant's life experience, with a lesser (though still significant) emphasis placed on traditional factors. Factors that may be considered in the Rutgers admissions process include, but are not limited to, work experience, personal accomplishments, and other aspects of the applicant's personal background.

Rutgers' admissions process is particularly significant when contrasted with the efforts of some law schools to maximize the undergraduate GPA and LSAT scores of their incoming classes, while increasing the number of part-time students whose GPA and LSAT scores are not counted toward rankings, in order to improve their standing in popular law school ranking publications.

Academics
The J.D. program at Rutgers requires a total of 90 credits to graduate. The 1L curriculum requires traditional courses in Torts, Contracts, Property, Criminal Law, Civil Procedure, Constitutional Law, and Legal Analysis, Writing and Research Skills.

All required courses are graded on a standard 2.95 - 3.1 GPA curve. 1Ls are grouped in small sections of roughly 30 people, who take all of the same required classes together. Though two or three sections are generally combined for required courses, each student has a 'small section' class where their section of 30 or fewer people is taught a required subject by a tenured faculty member. Students may choose to attend classes on either a full-time or part-time basis.

Journals
The law school has nine student journals:
Rutgers University Law Review (a merger of Rutgers Law Review and Rutgers Law Journal)
Rutgers Computer and Technology Law Journal, the first journal in the country to address the interaction between computers, technology and the law.
Women's Rights Law Reporter, the first journal in the country to focus on women's rights. Co-founded by then–Rutgers Professor Ruth Bader Ginsburg and Professor Nadine H. Taub.
Rutgers Journal of Law and Public Policy, previously known as the Rutgers Journal of Law and Urban Policy, focuses on current public policy issue in the United States. 
Rutgers Journal of Law and Religion was founded in 1999 and is one of the few journals on law and religion.
Rutgers Law Record, the first online law journal in the United States. 
Rutgers Race and the Law Review was founded in 1996 and is the second journal in the country to focus on the broad spectrum of multicultural issues.
Rutgers Business Law Review, formerly known as the Rutgers Bankruptcy Law Journal.
Rutgers International Law and Human Rights Journal, is one of the newest journals at Rutgers Law School.

The Business Law Review and International Law and Human Rights Journal were accredited in December 2019.

Costs
Tuition and fees at Rutgers law School for the 2016-2017 academic year is $27,011 (full-time, in-state) and $39,425 (full-time, out-of-state).

Rankings
According to the U.S. News & World Report Law School Rankings for 2023, the law school is ranked 86th overall, with its part-time program ranking 15th overall. The U.S. News rankings are based on successful placement of graduates, faculty resources, academic achievements of entering students, and opinions by law schools, lawyers and judges on overall program quality; however, U.S. News, per its data for 2019, has separately ranked the law school 9th in the country where full-time graduates who borrowed for law school and entered the private sector had the highest salary-to-debt ratio.

The National Law Journal ranked the law school 47th on its 2015 list of the Top 50 Go-To Law Schools. It was the only law school in New Jersey to appear on that list, which reported that 10.1% of the law school's 2014 graduates were hired directly by one of the country's top 250 law firms.

The law school ranks 41st in the nation in the 2019 Above the Law Rankings, which weighs graduate employment, quality of graduate jobs, education cost, alumni feedback, student debt, and the number of alumni serving as federal judges.

Finally, the law school is ranked 30th according to Business Insider's 2014 'Top Law Schools in America' list.

List of notable alumni
David A. Christian - retired United States Army captain and former candidate for United States Senate, class of 2011
Louis Freeh - former FBI director
Robert Menendez - US Senator from New Jersey
Hazel O'Leary - former US Secretary of Energy
Esther Salas - New Jersey Federal Judge, Class of 1994
Robert Torricelli- former United States Senator from New Jersey
Elizabeth Warren- US Senator, Class of 1976

People associated with Rutgers Law School 

Linda Wharton, Lawyer who argued and won Planned Parenthood v. Casey in front of U.S. Supreme Court

References

External links
 

 
Rutgers University colleges and schools
Law schools in New Jersey
Law schools in the New York metropolitan area
Education in Camden, New Jersey
Education in Newark, New Jersey
2015 establishments in New Jersey
Educational institutions established in 2015